Dipendra K. Khanal is Nepali screenwriter and film director, known best for his direction in Pashupati Prasad and Chapali height 2. Khanal's debut direction was The Yug Dekhi Yug Samma. He has directed films like Jholay, Vigilante, etc.

Filmography

|2022
|Ke Ghar Ke Dera
|Director 
|Blockbuster
|}2022

Awards and nominations

References

1982 births
Living people
Nepalese film directors
Nepalese film producers
People from Nuwakot District
21st-century Nepalese screenwriters
21st-century Nepalese film directors
Khas people